Folsom Field is an outdoor college football stadium in the western United States, located on the campus of the University of Colorado in Boulder. It is the home field of the Colorado Buffaloes of the Pac-12 Conference.

Opened  in 1924, the horseshoe-shaped stadium runs in the traditional north–south configuration, opening to the north. The CU athletic administration center, named after 1950s head coach Dal Ward, is located at the north end.

Folsom Field is the third highest stadium in FBS college football, behind only Wyoming and Air Force of the Mountain West Conference.

History

Gamble Field was the home of Colorado football for two decades, through the first game of the 1924 season. Opened as Colorado Stadium on October 11, Folsom Field has been the continuous home of Buffaloes football.

Colorado Stadium was renamed Folsom Field in 1944, following the death of former head coach Fred Folsom.

In 2008, Folsom Field became the first "zero-waste" stadium in the NCAA by instituting a rigorous recycling and composting program.

Expansions and renovations

When opened in 1924, the horseshoe-shaped stadium had a capacity of 26,000; a major expansion in 1956 raised the height of the stadium, with a new seating capacity of 45,000. The removal of the running track in 1967 added six thousand seats; the track and field team relocated to Potts Field on the East Campus.

A sizable, six-level press box was added in 1968 to the top of the west side grandstand, directly in front of Balch Fieldhouse, the former home of the basketball team. Renovations continued in 1976 when the old, rickety wooden bleachers were replaced with aluminum ones, raising the capacity to 52,005.

In 2003, suites and club seating were added to the east side of the stadium, raising the capacity to 53,750.  Since the 2003 renovation, 137 seats with obstructed views have been removed, lowering the seating capacity to 53,613.

In 2014, construction for a further expansion started. This expansion included a new indoor practice facility, a high performance sports center, as well as extra seating on the northeast corner of the stadium.

The latest expansion at Folsom Field was finished before the start of the 2016 season. Completed as part of a $156 million dollar initiative, the north endzone was completely rebuilt. Existing bleachers were renovated into large boxes, club level seating & areas.

Playing surface
From 1924 through 1970, the playing surface at Folsom Field was natural grass. In the summer of 1971, AstroTurf was installed and the first game played on the new surface was a 56–13 win over Wyoming on September 18.  Unranked in the preseason, the 1971 Buffs finished third in the AP Poll behind Nebraska and Oklahoma, for a sweep of the top three spots by the Big Eight Conference. The synthetic turf was replaced in 1978 and again in 1989, with "Astroturf-8."

After 28 years of AstroTurf, Folsom Field returned to natural grass in the spring of 1999. The project, which included bio-thermal heating, drainage, and a sub-air system, cost $1.2 million.

Other uses

Concerts
The Grateful Dead played at Folsom  on 9/3/72 and as part of their 15th anniversary June 7 & 8, 1980. 9/3/72 has been partially released on Dick's Picks Volume 36.

The Rolling Stones were at the venue on October 3 & 4, 1981.

The stadium played host to a concert, later released on DVD, by the Dave Matthews Band on July 11, 2001. More recently, in keeping with the decision to bring back live music to Folsom Field, the stadium hosted Dead & Co. for two-night stands during their 2016, 2017 and 2018 summer tours.

In popular culture
The south end zone was featured in the opening and closing credits of the late 1970s television show Mork and Mindy, which was set in Boulder.

Other events
Folsom Field is also used as the finish line for the Bolder Boulder, a popular 10K run.

The first Promise Keepers stadium conference was held at Folsom in June 1992.

Attendance records
The largest crowd for a CU football game at Folsom Field was 54,972 in 2005, against in-state rival Colorado State on September 3, in which the Buffaloes won with a 47-yard field goal by Mason Crosby with four seconds remaining.  This early-season, non-conference rivalry game, the Rocky Mountain Showdown, is more often played in neutral Denver at Mile High Stadium and its successor Empower Field at Mile High.

The largest crowd ever at Folsom Field was in 1977 for a rock concert, one of the popular Colorado Sun Day concert series. The attendance on May 1 was an estimated 61,500 (exceeding the seating capacity by about 9,000) for a show featuring Fleetwood Mac, Bob Seger, Firefall, and John Sebastian.

Gallery

See also
 List of NCAA Division I FBS football stadiums

References

External links

 
 Facility rental at Folsom Field for events - weddings, birthdays, conferences, etc.

College football venues
Colorado Buffaloes football venues
American football venues in Colorado
Defunct athletics (track and field) venues in the United States
Music venues in Colorado
Buildings and structures in Boulder, Colorado
Tourist attractions in Boulder, Colorado
Sports venues completed in 1924
1924 establishments in Colorado